Tomotaka Sakaguchi (坂口 智隆, born July 7, 1984, in Akashi, Hyōgo) is a Japanese professional baseball outfielder for the Tokyo Yakult Swallows in Japan's Nippon Professional Baseball. He previously played with the Osaka Kintetsu Buffaloes and Orix Buffaloes.

As of 2022, he is the last active NPB player to have played with the Kintestu Buffaloes.

References

External links

NPB.com

1984 births
Living people
Nippon Professional Baseball first basemen
Nippon Professional Baseball outfielders
Osaka Kintetsu Buffaloes players
Orix Buffaloes players
Baseball people from Hyōgo Prefecture
Tokyo Yakult Swallows players
People from Akashi, Hyōgo
Japanese expatriate baseball players in the United States
West Oahu Canefires players